Kashi Mahakal Express  is an express train of the Indian Railways connecting Varanasi Junction in Uttar Pradesh and Indore Junction in Madhya Pradesh via Prayagraj Junction. It is currently being operated with 20414/20415 train numbers weekly. This train shares its rake with Kashi Mahakal Express (via Lucknow). This was the 2nd private Humsafar Express train and 4th private train owned by Indian Railway Catering and Tourism Corporation (IRCTC), but now it is currently operated by Indian Railways.

Coach composition 
The trains is completely 3-tier AC sleeper trains designed by Indian Railways with features of LED screen display to show information about stations, train speed etc. and will have announcement system as well, Vending machines for tea, coffee and milk, Bio toilets in compartments as well as CCTV cameras.

Service 
It averages 60 km/hr as 82403 Humsafar Express covering 1102 km in 18 hrs 25 mins & 61 km/hr as 82404 Humsafar Express covering 1102 km in 18 hrs 5 mins.

Schedule

Locomotive

Both trains hauls by a Ghaziabad (GZB) / Vadodara (BRC) Electric Loco Shed based WAP 7 locomotive from end to end.

Stoppage 

 Varanasi Junction
 Allahabad Junction
 Kanpur Central
 Jhansi Junction
 Bina Junction
 Sant Hirdaram Nagar
 Ujjain Junction
 Indore Junction

See also 

 Humsafar Express
 Varanasi Junction
 Indore Junction
 Kashi Mahakal Express (via Lucknow)

References 

 https://indiarailinfo.com/train/irctc-kashi-mahakal-humsafar-express-via-allahabad-82404/112007/8/334
 https://indiarailinfo.com/train/irctc-kashi-mahakal-humsafar-express-via-allahabad-82403/112005/334/8

Humsafar Express trains
Transport in Indore
Passenger trains originating from Varanasi
Transport in Ujjain
Rail transport in Madhya Pradesh
Railway services introduced in 2020